Lee Sang-Yi (Hangul: 이상의, born 1922, date of death unknown) was a South Korean football midfielder who played for the South Korea in the 1954 FIFA World Cup. He also played for Seoul Football Club.

References

External links

1922 births
Year of death missing
South Korean footballers
South Korea international footballers
Association football midfielders
1954 FIFA World Cup players
Asian Games medalists in football
Footballers at the 1954 Asian Games
Medalists at the 1954 Asian Games
Asian Games silver medalists for South Korea